North High School (NHS) is senior high school in Bakersfield, California, United States.  The school is part of the Kern High School District. Its campus is on Galaxy Avenue.

History
It became apparent that the existing high schools in the Kern High School District were not sufficient in number for the accelerated growth of greater Bakersfield.  After several years of planning, ground was broken on March 23, 1952, for the construction of NHS.  On September 8, 1953, NHS held their first classes with an enrollment of 625 students, with 28 teachers and counselors. Second year enrollment grew to 927 with 49 on the staff, and the third-year enrollment swelled to 1,300 guided by a staff of 50. Over 60 years later, North High's enrollment is over 2,000 students and certificated staff over 80.

Jack Hill, the school's first principal, who served for two years until his untimely death, was succeeded by George Williamson in mid-1955. With Williamson's retirement in 1965, Jack Hilton, the school's vice principal since its opening, took over as principal. He served four years until taking a district administrative position. Mr. Harold Corrie, another Shafter High School principal, was appointed to head North High in 1969. Corrie replaced Mr. Hilton at the District Office, and North High's new Principal beginning July 1, 1973 was Dr. Richard M. Brown formerly vice-president of instruction at North. C. Warner Brooks, formerly assistant principal at Arvin High School became the principal of North High School in January 1985, as Dr. Brown was asked to head a task force at the District Office. In July 1989, William B. Bimat was appointed principal, and Mr. Brooks was appointed assistant superintendent for instruction. Mr. Bimat succumbed to cancer in December 1994. In February 1995 Jim Wren was named principal. Mr. Wrenbeaman retired at the end of 1997–98 school year. Mr. Bryon Schaefer was appointed principal in July 1998. Mr. Schaefer was the former assistant principal of instruction and was once dean of students at North.  In 2010 Mr. Schaefer was appointed assistant superintendent of personnel, and Alan Paradise was appointed principal.  In December 2015 Mark Balch was appointed principal of North High.

Academics
All students enrolled at NHS must meet the following criteria before graduation:

In total, 220 credits are necessary for a student at NHS to graduate. Every student must also pass the CAHSEE and an approved algebra course.

NHS offers AP, GATE, and Honors courses, which students can take to earn college credit, pass an SAT II exam, or be academically challenged.

Notable alumni
 George Culver - founder of Bakersfield College Baseball program and Major League Baseball pitcher
 Kevin Harvick - NASCAR driver, 2014 Sprint Cup champion and 2007 Daytona 500 Winner
 Colby Lewis - won game three of the 2010 World Series for the Texas Rangers
 Randy Rich - former NFL defensive back
 Stephen Underwood - drummer and vocalist for Southern Gospel Recording; touring artist, The Lighthouse Boys
  Ken Barnes  -  Eight time World Champion Skeet shooter

References

Educational institutions established in 1953
High schools in Bakersfield, California
Public high schools in California
1953 establishments in California